The events of 1997 in anime.

Accolades  
Animation Film Award: Princess Mononoke

Releases

See also
1997 in animation

External links 
Japanese animated works of the year, listed in the IMDb

Anime
Anime
Years in anime